Dinosaur World may refer to:

 Dinosaur World (Arkansas), a defunct theme park in Arkansas, USA
 Dinosaur World (Creswick), a defunct theme park in Creswick, Victoria, Australia
 Dinosaur World (theme parks), a family of theme parks in Florida, Kentucky and Texas in the US, each with over 150 life size dinosaur sculptures
 Dinosaur World (video game), a free downloadable video game published by the BBC

See also
 Dinosaur Planet (disambiguation)
 List of dinosaur parks